Princess Aleksandra Lubomirska (1760–1836) was a Polish szlachcianka, landowner and art collector.

She married Stanisław Kostka Potocki on 2 June 1776.

Further reading

 Potocka-Wąsowiczowa, Anna z Tyszkiewiczów. Wspomnienia naocznego świadka. Warszawa: Państwowy Instytut Wydawniczy, 1965.

1760 births
1836 deaths
People from Lublin
Aleksandra Lubomirska